Pararhadinorhynchus is a genus of worms belonging to the family Diplosentidae.

The species of this genus are found in Australia.

Species:

Pararhadinorhynchus coorongensis 
Pararhadinorhynchus magnus 
Pararhadinorhynchus mugilis 
Pararhadinorhynchus sodwanensis 
Pararhadinorhynchus upenei

References

Acanthocephalans